The 2013–14 KBL season was the 18th season of the Korean Basketball League (KBL), the highest level of basketball in South Korea. Ulsan Hyundai Mobis Phoebus retained their title, their fifth overall.

Clubs

Regular season

Playoffs

References

External links
  

Korean Basketball League seasons
2013–14 in South Korean basketball